Eudonia paltomacha is a moth in the family Crambidae. It was described by Edward Meyrick in 1884. It is endemic to New Zealand.

The wingspan is 22–24 mm for males and about 17 mm for females. The forewings are light fuscous, irrorated with whitish. The veins are lined with blackish and there is a whitish dot in the disc beyond the middle, margined above with blackish. The hindwings are grey-whitish. Adults have been recorded on wing in January.

References

Moths described in 1884
Eudonia
Endemic fauna of New Zealand
Moths of New Zealand
Taxa named by Edward Meyrick
Endemic moths of New Zealand